Beladin is a small town in Betong Division, Sarawak, Malaysia. Like Maludam and Pusa, Beladin is also made up of a few Malay fishing villages.

Towns in Sarawak